Catherine of Guelders (ca. 1440 – Guelders, January 25, 1497), was regent of the Duchy of Guelders between 1477 and 1492. First for her brother during his absence, and then for her nephew.

Life

Catherine of Guelders was the fourth and youngest child of Arnold, Duke of Guelders (1410-1473) and Catherine of Cleves (1417–1479).
Until 1477, she led an inconspicuous life, in the shadow of her brother Adolf, at war with his father, and her sisters Mary, married to King James II of Scotland and Margaret, married to Frederick I, Count Palatine of Simmern. 

Despite efforts by her father, no suitable husband was found for Catherine. 17th century theories that she was secretly married with Louis de Bourbon, Bishop of Liège, are now believed to be false.

Regency

Everything changed for Catherine in 1477, when Charles the Bold was killed in the Battle of Nancy. Guelders had been under control of Charles the Bold since 1473, and now saw the chance to regain its independence. As her brother Adolf was in Flanders, the States of Guelders convinced him to appoint his sister Catherine as regent, pending his return.  Catherine reluctantly agreed. 

The regency lasted much longer than expected, because Adolf was killed in battle on June 27, 1477. She continued to rule as regent for his son Charles II, who was held with his sister Philippa by the Burgundians.

Catherine became involved in the Guelderian War of Independence with Maximilian of Austria. 

In 1482, she was forced to conclude peace with Maximilian and to retire from politics.

In 1492, she witnessed the regained independence of Guelders under her nephew Charles II, Duke of Guelders.  

Catherine died in 1497 and was buried in the church of Geldern, where her grave can still be seen.

Footnotes

1497 deaths
House of Egmond
Dukes of Guelders
15th-century women rulers
Year of birth uncertain
Medieval Dutch women
15th-century women of the Holy Roman Empire